Tunjung, or Tunjung Dayak, is an Austronesian language of Borneo.

References

Mahakam languages
Languages of Indonesia